Jim Oliver is an American novelist.  His first book was Closing Distance, published in 1992, and Wings in the Snow.  He lives in Hawaii.

Oliver served in the Philippines in the Peace Corps from 1962 to 1964.

Oliver's books center around the ambiguities of gay urban life at the end of the 20th century.  His characters are men who are torn by issues of their own sexuality and at the same time are committed to their families of origin, friends, lovers, and the community at large.

Reviews
A reviewer in The Advocate said, "Oliver's second novel (his first, Closing Distance, was a finalist for the New Voices Award) explores the notion of the extended family, a subject the author says he considers "the central issue in all of our lives and the only thing we may all have in common." Gay parenting and closeted romances get a good going-over in this page-turner about an upwardly mobile homo whose life is crumbling around him. Oliver investigates issues of gay identity—I'm rich and powerful and nobody knows I'm queer, so I must be successful—with humor and a good dose of compassion, a neat trick in a story about a guy so full of himself he forgets to come home for dinner."

Another reviewer (at http://www.rldbooks.com/Newsletter/Indy-News-Issue8/Issue8-p5.html) said:

"The first novel of his I encountered, Closing Distance, is about a very successful florist, Pete Flowers, who is approaching his fortieth birthday. His mother Elizabeth has a brain tumour and, having realised that time is running out, confronts her son with his gayness and seeming lack of direction. She forces him to look at his unexamined life and do something with it before time runs out for him too.  By the end of the book he has decided to get back with his former lover, Bill, and to be tested for HIV. Such are the bones of the story, but it is what Oliver does with it that is such a joy. All the characters, Pete's parents and siblings, Bill and the maid Carmen are fully rounded figures whose lives all come under the microscope as Elizabeth battles with her illness and determines to carry on living as nearly a normal life as she can. The book is written with affection, wit and gentle humour and is one of those books that demand to be re-read to yield more treasures that may have been missed first time round. Oliver is a master of throwaway humour, refreshing in a time of frenetic campery. His handling of social embarrassment and the ambiguities of relationships is deft and amusing."

The same reviewer continued, "Wings in the Snow follows a similar pattern to Closing Distance in that the main character, this time a surgeon called Theo Tithonus, is also forced to examine and put in order his life and repair his relationship with his lover, Sam. His crisis is precipitated by his medical partner unexpectedly dumping their daughter on him for a week. The child has been conceived by AID and has not, until now, been publicly acknowledged. Looking after the child causes Theo to come out, as Pete came out, and deal with the unresolved aspects of his life. Again, this is done with great humour. The relationship he has with his bossy sisters and the scene in the Ritz-Carlton in which Theo engages a junior colleague as an additional partner to relieve the pressure on his practice are beautifully understated comedy. The plot, rather than the characterisation, plays a bigger part in this second novel and some readers may think that the characters in both books inhabit too privileged a social stratum to know what "real" problems are. This is a debatable point but it enables Oliver, as it enabled Henry James, to concentrate on states of mind and emotions that we can all identify with. Both books are not only entertaining and thought-provoking, they are also extremely well-written and hugely enjoyable. I look forward to the next book with unbated breath!"

Living people
Year of birth missing (living people)
Peace Corps volunteers
American male writers